Alfred Laureta (May 21, 1924 – November 16, 2020)  was a district judge of the District Court for the Northern Mariana Islands.

Early life and education 

Laureta was born May 21, 1924 in  Ewa District, Oahu, Territory of Hawaii. He earned his Bachelor of Education from the University of Hawaiʻi at Mānoa and his Bachelor of Laws from the Fordham University School of Law.

Legal career 

He served as a judge of the 1st Circuit Court in Honolulu from 1967 to 1969. From 1969 to 1978 he served as a judge of the 5th Circuit Court in Kauai.

District Court service 

He was recommended to a judgeship by Senator Daniel Inouye. On April 7, 1978, President Jimmy Carter nominated Laureta to be a judge of the District Court for the Northern Mariana Islands. On April 10, 1978, his nomination was sent to the United States Senate. He was confirmed in June 1978, was sworn in on July 14, 1978 and was the first federal judge of Filipino ancestry in U.S. history. He retired on November 18, 1988. He died on November 16, 2020 at the age of 96.

Personal life 

He met his wife Evelyn in New York while she was a nursing student and she died in 2012.

See also
List of Asian American jurists

References

External links 

1924 births
2020 deaths
20th-century American judges
American jurists of Filipino descent
Fordham University School of Law alumni
Hawaii people of Filipino descent
Hawaii state court judges
Northern Mariana Islands judges
People from Oahu
People of the Territory of Hawaii
United States district court judges appointed by Jimmy Carter
University of Hawaiʻi at Mānoa alumni